Swanton is an English surname. Notable people with this surname include the following:

 Cedric Howell Swanton (1899–1970), Australian psychiatrist
 Charles Swanton (born 1972), British oncologist
 Dave Swanton, American football coach
 Diane Swanton (born 1979), South African sport shooter
 Ernest William Swanton (mycologist) (1870–1958), English mycologist, naturalist, antiquarian, and museum curator
 E. W. Swanton (1907–2000), British cricket writer
 Francis Swanton (–1661), English politician and lawyer
 Fred Swanton (1862–1940), American politician and entrepreneur
 John R. Swanton (1873–1958), American anthropologist
 Lloyd Swanton (born 1960), Australian jazz musician and composer
 Louise Swanton Belloc (1796–1881), French writer
 Mary Hynes Swanton (1861–1940), Australian trade unionist
 Michael Swanton (born 1939), British polymath
 Robert Swanton (died 1765), Royal Navy officer
 William Swanton (–1681), English politician

English-language surnames